Sapogenins are the aglycones, or non-saccharide, portions of the family of natural products known as saponins.  Sapogenins contain steroid or other triterpene frameworks as their key organic feature. For example, steroidal sapogenins such as tiggenin, neogitogenin, and tokorogenin have been isolated from the tubers of Chlorophytum arundinaceum. Some steroidal sapogenins can serve as a practical starting point for the semisynthesis of particular steroid hormones. 

Diosgenin and hecogenin are other examples of sapogenins.

References 

Phytochemicals
Triterpenes
Alcohols